Ghost Voyage is a 2008 horror television film produced for broadcast on the Sci Fi Channel in the United States. Its cast includes Antonio Sabato Jr., Deanna Russo, P.J. Marino and Cary-Hiroyuki Tagawa. The story contains many elements of an updated Outward Bound and Between Two Worlds.

Plot summary
The plot deals with nine strangers, most of whom are engaged in criminal and/or morally questionable acts, who wake up on an abandoned cargo ship with no memory of how they arrived there.  The ship's steward explains the rules to them. The unfortunate passengers soon find out that the ship is haunted by malevolent spirits and that they've each been brought there for a particular reason. The spirits immediately take those who have committed great sins (i.e. murder, adultery, etc.).

Six of the strangers die because they broke a rule. The remaining 3 learn that they are actually dead. The steward congratulates them for not breaking any rules, and then explains what is happening. According to an old legend, people who have committed sins are transported to this ship after they die. The sea tests them to see if they have learned from their lives. Those who pass the test are given a second chance at life. Those who don't have their spirits swallowed by the sea and are thrown into Hell.

Working together, the three retrieve a boat on the cargo ship and set sail. More demons attempt to kill them on the sea. One of them is sucked to hell after being selfish, and the other two survive and get a second chance. They get back to their lives but have no memory of the events on the ship and do not remember each other when they meet. The last scene shows the steward explaining the rules to the next set of strangers, implying a continuous cycle.

Cast

References

External links
 

2008 television films
American supernatural horror films
2008 horror films
Syfy original films
Films shot in Bulgaria
Films set on ships
2008 films
2000s supernatural horror films
American horror television films
2000s American films
2000s English-language films